Diving support equipment is the equipment used to facilitate a diving operation. It is either not taken into the water during the dive, such as the gas panel and compressor, or is not integral to the actual diving, being there to make the dive easier or safer, such as a surface decompression chamber. Some equipment, like a diving stage, is not easily categorised as diving or support equipment, and may be considered as either.

Breathing gas equipment

Platforms

Habitats

Decompression equipment

Deployment systems 
 
 
 
  
 
 
  – A suspended foot support allowing divers to use a leg to help lift themselves from the water into the boat.

Remotely controlled underwater vehicles

Dive planning and recording equipment

Safety equipment

Other 
  – Equipment to heat water and supply it to a surface-supplied diver through the umbilical system.

References